The Jerusalem Post Lite is an Israeli weekly easy-English newspaper/magazine for improving English. It was founded on 16 July 2009 by Jerusalem Post Group CEO Ronit Hassin Hochman. The weekly readership numbers are in the tens of thousands.

Purpose
The Jerusalem Post Lite was created to answer an increasing demand in Israel for ESL (English as Second Language) studies on one's free time, as opposed to a school, university or other limited courses.

Format
The Jerusalem Post Lite has 32 pages. Only three of them are dedicated to advertisement. Readers have often asked for advertisement in Hebrew.
Readers receive a weekly newspaper format with subjects running across the board, from hard news to light easy-reading articles.
The success of the Jerusalem Post Lite is anchored in the fact that on each page there is a dictionary that translates specific words by context, and not literally, into Hebrew and into phonetic pronunciation. 
There are three levels of English in the Jerusalem Post Lite. Each article has a level: one, two or three stars.
On the last pages there are English exercises and crosswords.

Content
The content is the pillar of the magazine. Choosing the right content for Israeli readers is a delicate task. In the beginning content was taken ONLY from the Jpost daily newspaper but soon enough the Israeli readers complained that this content was not interesting enough for them to make an effort and read in a different language, and they were right. 
Nimrod Ganzarski was given the position of Editor-in-Chief in order to create a magazine fit for Israelis, with content that would keep Israelis in the magazine working hard at reading and improving their English. 
Content is taken from different sources within the Jerusalem Post Group and also created by the staff and other reporters. 
The content is then edited down to an easy and simple language broken down into three levels of English.
The content includes hard news, economy, family and children's issues, health, travel, books, technology and internet, fashion, and more.

Target Markets
There are several target markets reading the Jerusalem Post Lite:
 Businessmen working mainly in English-speaking countries
 University students
 Managerial levels
 Government representatives
 Others

Staff
The Jerusalem Post Lite is part of the Jerusalem Post Group, under CEO Ronit Hassin Hofman.
The Editor in Chief of English Improvement Department, including the Jerusalem Post Lite, is Adi Shtamberger (עדי שטמברגר).

References

External links 
 Official website
 https://m.facebook.com/JPostLite/References

The Jerusalem Post
Weekly newspapers published in Israel
Mass media in Jerusalem